Washington Pakamisa (born 15 October 1984) is a Zimbabwean football striker who plays for Mutare City Rovers.

References

1984 births
Living people
Zimbabwean footballers
Zimbabwe international footballers
CAPS United players
Gunners F.C. players
Kiglon F.C. players
Dynamos F.C. players
Liga Desportiva de Maputo players
Ngezi Platinum F.C. players
Association football forwards
Zimbabwe Premier Soccer League players
Zimbabwean expatriate footballers
Expatriate footballers in Mozambique
Zimbabwean expatriate sportspeople in Mozambique
Sportspeople from Harare